Rafael Montero may refer to:

 Rafael Montero (baseball) (born 1990), Dominican baseball pitcher
 Rafael Montero (film director) (born 1953), Mexican film director
 Rafael Montero (cyclist)  (1913–?), Chilean cyclist